Brandon T. "Butch" Grover was an American former college basketball coach.  He graduated from Ohio University in 1919.  He joined the coaching staff at Ohio after he graduated.  He was the head coach of the men's basketball team from 1922 through 1938 and is third on the school's list of all-time coaching wins. He led the Bobcats to three Buckeye Athletic Association championships in the 1930s. After retiring from coaching be authored a book on the by-laws of 12 different sports which was subsequently used by many universities.  Grover Center on the Ohio University campus in Athens, Ohio as well as a heath lecture series at Ohio are named in his honor.

Head coaching record

Source:

References

Ohio Bobcats men's basketball coaches
Ohio University alumni
Ohio University faculty